Elsie Janis (born Elsie Bierbower, March 16, 1889 – February 26, 1956) was an American actress of stage and screen, singer, songwriter, screenwriter and radio announcer. Entertaining the troops during World War I immortalized her as "the sweetheart of the AEF" (American Expeditionary Force).

Early life
Elsie Bierbower was born in Marion, Ohio, the daughter of Josephine Janis and John Eleazer Bierbower. She had a brother, Percy John.

Stage
Bierbower first took to the stage at age 2. By age 11, she was a headliner on the vaudeville circuit, performing under the name Little Elsie. As she matured, using the stage name Elsie Janis, she began perfecting her comedic skills. 

Acclaimed by American and British critics, Janis was a headliner on Broadway and London. On Broadway, she starred in a number of successful shows, including The Vanderbilt Cup (1906), The Hoyden (1907), The Slim Princess (1911), and The Century Girl (1916).

Elsie performed at the grand opening of the Brown Theatre in Louisville, Kentucky on October 5, 1925.

Film, screenwriting and music
Janis also enjoyed a career as a Hollywood actress, screenwriter, production manager and composer. She was co-credited alongside Gene Markey for writing the original story for Close Harmony (1929) and as composer and production manager for Paramount on Parade (1930). She and director Edmund Goulding wrote the song "Love, Your Magic Spell Is Everywhere" for Gloria Swanson for her talkie debut film The Trespasser (1929). Janis's song "Oh, Give Me Time for Tenderness" was featured in the Bette Davis movie Dark Victory (1939), also directed by Goulding.

Life with Basil Hallam
Before he entered service for World War I, English actor-singer Basil Hallam fell in love with Janis, with whom he had starred in The Passing Show of 1915. They set up home in the city of Liverpool, England. The couple never married; Hallam was killed in the Battle of the Somme in August 1916 while serving with the Royal Flying Corps.

World War I

Janis advocated for British and American soldiers fighting in World War I. She raised funds for Liberty Bonds. Accompanied by her mother, Janis also took her act on the road, entertaining troops stationed near the front lines – one of the first popular American artists to do so in a war fought on foreign soil. Ten days after the armistice, she recorded for HMV several numbers from her revue Hullo, America, including "Give Me the Moonlight, Give Me the Girl". She wrote about her wartime experiences in The Big Show: My Six Months with the American Expeditionary Forces (published in 1919), and recreated these in Behind the Lines, a 1926 Vitaphone musical short.

A musical about this period of her life called Elsie Janis and the Boys, written by Carol J. Crittenden and composer John T. Prestianni, premiered under the direction of Charles A. Wallace as part of the Rotunda Theatre Series in the Wortley-Peabody Theater in Dallas, Texas on August 15, 2014.

Radio announcer
In 1934, Janis became the first female announcer on the NBC radio network.

Children
Janis expressed no desire to have children of her own, saying she would never meet the standards her mother set, and said that her young husband could be her child.

She was foster mother to a 14-year-old Italian war veteran and orphan, Michael Cardi, in 1919.

Later life
Janis maintained her private home “ElJan” on the east side of High Street in Columbus, Ohio. The home was across the street from what was Ohio State University's Ohio Field, the precursor to Ohio Stadium. Janis sold the house following her mother's death.

In 1932, Janis married Gilbert Wilson, who was 16 years her junior, which caused some scandal. There is some evidence it might have been a bearded relationship. The couple lived in the Phillipse Manor section of Sleepy Hollow, New York, formerly named North Tarrytown, until Janis moved to the Los Angeles area of California where she lived until her death. Her final film was the 1940 Women in War.

Elsie Janis died in 1956 at her home in Beverly Hills, California, aged 66, and was interred in the Forest Lawn Memorial Park Cemetery in Glendale, California.

Legacy
For her contribution to the motion picture industry, Elsie Janis has a star on the Hollywood Walk of Fame at 6776 Hollywood Blvd.

Partial filmography
 The Caprices of Kitty (1915) 
 Betty in Search of a Thrill (1915)
 Nearly a Lady (1915)
 'Twas Ever Thus (1915)
 The Imp (1919)
 A Regular Girl (1919)
 Bobbed Hair (1925)
 Elsie Janis in a Vaudeville Act, “Behind the Lines,” Assisted by Men’s Chorus of the 107th Regiment (1926)
 Close Harmony (1929) (screenplay)
 Paramount on Parade (1930) (production supervisor)
 Madam Satan (1930) (music)
 The Squaw Man (1931) (screenplay)
 Women in War (1940)

References

External links

 
 
 
 
 
 Extensive biographical site at Ohio State University
 Elsie Janis collection: SPEC.TRI.EJ  Thompson Library Jerome Lawrence & Robert E. Lee Theatre Research Institute
Elsie Janis diaries, 1920-1928, held by the Billy Rose Theatre Division, New York Public Library for the Performing Arts
 Elsie Janis, images held by the Billy Rose Theatre Division, New York Public Library for the Performing Arts
 selected recordings by Elsie Janis at Internetarchive.org
portrait of Elsie Janis from a play or early silent movie(moviecard)
Elsie Janis: Broadway Photographs(Univ. of South Carolina)
Elsie Janis with Willys Overland motorcar 1917

1889 births
1956 deaths
19th-century American actresses
American stage actresses
American film actresses
American silent film actresses
American women in World War I
Songwriters from Ohio
Screenwriters from California
Burials at Forest Lawn Memorial Park (Glendale)
Actresses from Beverly Hills, California
Actresses from Columbus, Ohio
People from Marion, Ohio
People from Sleepy Hollow, New York
Vaudeville performers
20th-century American actresses
Musicians from Beverly Hills, California
Singers from California
Songwriters from California
Screenwriters from Ohio
Screenwriters from New York (state)
20th-century American singers
20th-century American women singers
American women screenwriters
American expatriate actresses in the United Kingdom
20th-century American women writers
20th-century American screenwriters
Victor Records artists